James Merilus Simms (December 27, 1823 – July 9, 1912) was an African-American minister, newspaper publisher, author, and  elected representative in the Georgia Assembly during the Reconstruction era.

Simms was born a slave in Savannah, Georgia. A carpenter by trade, he bought his freedom in 1857. In around 1864, having been condemned for teaching slaves, he was sentenced to be publicly whipped and fined $100. He left Savannah for Boston and became a chaplain in the Union Army, later returning to his home district. Simms may have been the same person as the James M. Symms whose company published an edition of The Black Man in 1863.

Simms and his African-American colleagues in the Georgia Assembly were prohibited from taking office after a vote by their colleagues. Federal intervention in 1870 overturned the discriminatory action. He wrote about his church's history in Savannah, Georgia.

In 1870, he supported the Baptist minister and Assembly delegate Ulysses L. Houston in occupying the Bryan County Baptist Church, which had been taken over by his rival Alexander Harris; for their role in this protest, Houston and Simms were both arrested.

See also
First Bryan Baptist Church

References

1823 births
1912 deaths
African-American politicians during the Reconstruction Era
African-American state legislators in Georgia (U.S. state)
African-American writers
African-American Baptist ministers
Original 33
19th-century American slaves
American carpenters
People from Savannah, Georgia
Georgia (U.S. state) Republicans
20th-century African-American people